Rob Elowitch (born April 8, 1943), better known by his ring name, Robbie Ellis, is an American professional wrestler who has competed in New England and Mid-Atlantic independent circuit as well as international promotions in Europe. The co-owner of the prestigious Barridoff Galleries, he was the subject of a Sports Illustrated article as well as considerable television and press coverage from World News Tonight, The Today Show, The Osgood File, The MacNeil/Lehrer News Hour, Time and Again, and MTV's True Life and the National Enquirer.

In 2000 he started wrestling for Chikara, Innovative Hybrid Wrestling, Showcase Pro Wrestling, No Limit Pro Wrestling, Pro Wrestling America, Pro Wrestling Revolution, Independent Wrestling Entertainment, New England Championship Wrestling, as the grandfather of wrestler Ryan Matthews, and the Millennium Wrestling Federation. From January to November 2007, he went on tour with Italian Championship Wrestling. At age 63, he was the oldest wrestler on the roster.

He is the subject of a feature-length documentary Canvasman: The Robbie Ellis Story directed by Gary Robinov. In 2010, it was an official selection of the Maine Jewish Film Festival, Atlantic City Film and Music Festival, Camden International Film Festival, South Dakota Film Festival, and Cape Ann Film Festivals; and, during 2011, the San Diego and Toronto Jewish Film Festivals, Lewiston Auburn Film Festival, and Portsmouth (NH) Film Festival among others. On May 12, 2011, it was screened on the Maine Public Broadcasting Network preceded by a half hour interview.

In 2014, Ellis returned to Chikara as the promotion's new storyline owner.

Championships and accomplishments

Coastal Pro Wrestling
CPW Junior Heavyweight Championship (1 time)

Eastern Wrestling Alliance
EWA Light Heavyweight Championship (1 time)

Green Mountain Wrestling
GMW World Lightweight Championship (2 times)

International Championship Wrestling
ICW Light Heavyweight Championship (3 times)

Independent Wrestling Entertainment
IWE International Championship (1 time)

New England Independent
Personality of the Year (2005)

New England Pro Wrestling
NEPW Junior Heavyweight Championship (1 time)

New England Pro Wrestling Hall of Fame
Class of 2008
Entertainer of the Year (2009)
Lifetime Achievement Award (2010)

New Wrestling Horizons
NWH Cruiserweight Championship (1 time)

Pro Wrestling Illustrated
PWI ranked him #441 of the 500 best singles wrestlers of the PWI 500 in 1991 and similar for several other years through 2008

Ringside Wrestling / World Independent Wrestling
Ringside Junior Heavyweight Championship (1 time)

Yankee Pro Wrestling
YPW Lightweight Championship (1 time)

Other titles
AWA North Atlantic Cruiserweight Championship (7 times)
NAWA Lightweight Championship (1 time)

References

General

Specific

Further reading

External links
Robbie Ellis, Professional Wrestler, official website

Canvasmanmovie.com, official website of the documentary "Canvasman: The Robbie Ellis Story"

1943 births
Living people
American male professional wrestlers
Sportspeople from Portland, Maine
Professional wrestlers from Maine
20th-century professional wrestlers
21st-century professional wrestlers
ICW/IWCCW Light Heavyweight Champions